Ponte di Brenta was a railway station in the Italian city of Padua, in the Veneto region. The station was located on the Milan–Venice railway. The station closed on 13 December 2015.

This area is now served by a bus service.

Train services
The station was served by the following service(s):

Local services (Treno regionale) Verona - Vicenza - Padua - Venice

Railway stations in Veneto
Province of Padua